KJAN (1220 AM) is a commercial radio station serving the Atlantic, Iowa area. The station was first licensed October 3, 1950. The station primarily broadcasts an adult contemporary format.  KJAN is licensed to Wireless Communications Corp.

References

External links
KJAN website

JAN
Mainstream adult contemporary radio stations in the United States
Radio stations established in 1950
1950 establishments in Iowa